Leroy Zimmerman is the name of:
Leroy M. Zimmerman (born 1932), former Member of the Pennsylvania House of Representatives
LeRoy S. Zimmerman (born 1934), former Pennsylvania Attorney General

See also
Roy Zimmerman (disambiguation)
Zimmerman (disambiguation)